Milorad Bojic (Zemun, January 4, 1951 — Kragujevac, January 22, 2016) was a doctor of technical sciences and a full professor at the Faculty of Engineering Sciences at the University of Kragujevac, a distinguished scientific worker, and since 2015 a corresponding member of the SANU Department of Technical Sciences .[1]

Numerous articles published in world's most respected journals in the area of energy management made professor Milorad Bojic one of the top scientists and lecturers in his area of expertise. Professor Bojic had rich research experience in various fields including energy recovery, thermal comfort, finite-time thermodynamics, Integration, thermo economy, Global warming, air conditioning engineering, etc.

Biography 
Milorad Bojić graduated from the Faculty of Mechanical Engineering of the University of Belgrade, Department in Kragujevac in 1974, and received his master's degree from the University of Syracuse, USA in 1977 at the Department of Mechanical and Aerospace Engineering, on the topic Two Dimensional Mathematical Model of Non-Buoyant Jet in a Cross - Flow. He received his doctorate at the Faculty of Engineering Sciences of the University of Kragujevac (then the Faculty of Mechanical Engineering of the University of Kragujevac) in 1984, where he continued his academic career and worked as a full professor at the Department of Energy and Process Engineering. At the Faculty of Engineering Sciences of the University of Kragujevac, he was vice-dean for science 1989-1991, head of the Department of Energy and Process Technology, manager of the Regional Center for Energy Management and manager of the Center for Heating, Air Conditioning and Solar Energy. He is married to Slavica, with whom he has a son, Ljubisa Bojic, a scientist in the field of sociology of the future.

Professional biography-titles 
Milorad Bojić worked at the Faculty of Engineering Sciences of the University of Kragujevac as: assistant (1974-1984), assistant professor (1984-1990), associate professor (1990-1995) and full professor from 1995 to 2016. At Syracuse University he was a Research Assistant and Technical Officer (1976-1978); at the Hong Kong Polytechnic University, research professor (1999-2001); visiting professor at Nagoya University in Japan in 1997, at Hong Kong Polytechnic University from 2001 to 2003, at University of Reunion in France from 2009 to 2011 and at the National University of Applied Sciences (INSA) in Lyon, France in 2012. Milorad Bojić was a member of the international scientific committee of the European Commission Energy & Agriculture towards the Third Millennium conference in Athens in 1999.

Professional Biography - Positions 

 Center for Integrated Research in Science and Engineering, Nagoya University, Japan. 1997
 The Hong Kong Polytechnic University, Department of Building Services Engineering, Hong Kong, China. 1999.
 University of Hong Kong, Department of Mechanical Engineering. 2006.
 University of Reunion, Department of Civil Engineering, Reunion Island, France. 2010.

Selected publications

Books 

 Termotehnika 1987. COBISS.SR 512117397
 Termodinamika 2011. COBISS.SR 184810508
 Vazdušni mlaz u poprečnoj vazdušnoj struji 1987. COBISS.SR 32150535

Scientific papers 

 SA Kalogirou, M Bojic(2000)Artificial neural networks for the prediction of the energy consumption of a passive solar building. Energy 25 (5), 479-491
 M Bojic, F Yik, P Sat (2001)Influence of thermal insulation position in building envelope on the space cooling of high-rise residential buildings in Hong Kong. Energy and Buildings 33 (6), 569-581
 M Bojic, N Trifunovic, G Papadakis, S Kyritsis (1997)Numerical simulation, technical and economic evaluation of air-to-earth heat exchanger coupled to a building. Energy 22 (12), 1151-1158
 M Bojić, N Nikolić, D Nikolić, J Skerlić, I Miletić(2011)Toward a positive-net-energy residential building in Serbian conditions Applied Energy 88 (7), 2407-2419
 M Bojic, F Yik, W Leung (2002)Thermal insulation of cooled spaces in high rise residential buildings in Hong Kong Energy Conversion and Management 43 (2), 165-183

Dissertation 
Milorad Bojic received his doctorate at the Faculty of Engineering Sciences, University of Kragujevac in 1984, on the topic: Experimental investigations of turbulent air jet in a transverse air current at variable jet temperature.

References

Sources 
 Short Bio

External links 
 Professor Milorad Bojic web page
 Biography on Serbian Academy of Sciences Website
 Serbian Scientific Society Necrolog
 University of Reunion
 Hong Kong Polytechnic University, Department of Building Services Engineering
 Syracuse University

Serbian scientists
Living people
Year of birth missing (living people)